Eyes Set to Kill is an American post-hardcore and metalcore band from Tempe, Arizona. The Rodriguez sisters, lead guitarist Alexia and bassist Anissa, along with vocalist Lindsey Vogt started the band in 2003. Lindsey Vogt departed the band in mid-2007 due to issues with management. Lindsey would go on to form a solo project known as "The Taro Sound", and eventually form the band "The Attraction." After Lindsey's departure, Alexia assumed her position as lead vocalist as well as guitarist. Anissa left in late 2016 but returned to the band in 2023.

The World Outside received widespread critical acclaim and the group was featured on the cover of USA Today, as one of Alternative Press Magazine's "100 Bands You Need To Know", and hosted an episode of MTV's Headbangers Ball. Broken Frames was ranked fifth on the list of "Locals Only: The Best Albums and EPs in 2010".

History 
Eyes Set to Kill began in 2003 as a three-piece band from Tempe, Arizona. Alexia Rodriguez (lead guitar, backing vocals), Anissa Rodriguez (bass), and Lindsey Vogt (lead vocals); their name derived from a line out of a poem Alexia wrote in secondary school. Over the next several months, the band continued to undergo changes in their lineup. In early 2006 Alex Torres (rhythm guitar), Corey Pattakos (backing vocals), and Caleb Clifton (drums) joined and recorded a nine-song EP, When Silence Is Broken, the Night Is Torn, at Larry Elyea's Glendale, Arizona home studio: Mind's Eye Digital Recording Studios. The EP featured guitarist Alex Torres and original vocalist, Lindsey Vogt and sold 11,000 units. Their debut full-length album, Reach, was released February 19, 2008, peaking at No. 29 on the Billboard Heatseekers chart and No. 77 on Billboards Independent Music charts in 2008 selling 1,900 copies in its first week. The first single from the album was "Reach", with their following single as "Darling".

Their second album, The World Outside, was released June 2, 2009. It sold 2,400 copies in the U.S. in its first week of release, according to Nielsen SoundScan.  and peaked at No. 9 on the Billboard Heatseekers chart and No. 26 on the Independent Albums chart

Their third studio album, Broken Frames, was released on June 8, 2010. Its first single, "All You Ever Knew", was released on April 1, 2010 on revolvermag.com and on their MySpace page. Brandon Anderson resigned from the band in early July.

On October 12, 2010, Alexia released her debut solo album, Underground Sounds as Lexia. On October 26, 2010, "Let Me In", which as released as a bonus track on Broken Frames, was released as its first single with a video. Greg Kerwin left the band in early 2011.

On June 7, 2011, the band announced they started their own record label, Foresee Records, and would no longer be with Breaksilence Records. They released White Lotus through a joint venture between their own label Foresee Records and Maphia Entertainment on August 9,2011. They embarked on a tour with Falling in Reverse and For All Those Sleeping throughout September and October 2011.

On July 19, 2012, they announced signing to Century Media Records. On December 20, 2012, they reached 1,000,000 likes on Facebook prompting them to release a free download of a new demo for their upcoming album. To promote their upcoming album the band released a video for the song "Infected" on September 5, 2013. Masks was released September 17, 2013.

On July 10, they announced that they were forced to cancel an Oklahoma City show due a health issue with Anissa Rodriguez. In September 2015, they were support for New Years Day on their "Other Side Tour" North American Tour.

In March 2016 the band announced a co-headliner tour named "The Visions Tour" with Texas-based band One-Eyed Doll and Open Your Eyes as support. To promote the tour, Eyes Set to Kill and One-Eyed Doll recorded a cover of Depeche Mode's "Enjoy the Silence".

The band released, "Break", in advance of their sixth album on March 24, 2017 via Spotify and on February 1, 2018, "Not Sorry". On February 16, 2018, they released their self-titled album via Century Media Records.

In 2017, Alexia Rodriguez formed band The Secret Destroyers with former vocalist Lindsey Vogt and Teresa Brenneman.

On February 18, 2021 Eyes Set To Kill premiered new single "Find Our Way" via SiriusXM Octane, their first with new label Revival Recordings. The band's track "Face The Rain (Feat. Howard Jones)" also premiered on Octane, and was released on September 23, 2021 alongside the announcement that their new EP DAMNA would be released on December 3, 2021.

Band members 

Current members
 Alexia Rodriguez – lead guitar (2003–present); keyboards, synthesizers, piano (2003–2010, 2011–present); clean vocals (2007–present); backing vocals (2003–2007), rhythm guitar (2011, 2014–2015, 2022–present), bass (2016–2017, 2017–2023)
 Anissa Rodriguez – bass (2003–2016, 2023–present)
 Caleb Clifton – drums, percussion, samples (2006–present)

Former members
 Spencer Merrill – unclean vocals (2003)
 David Phipps – drums, percussion (2003)
 Austin Vanderbur – unclean vocals (2003–2006)
 Zack Hansen – rhythm guitar (2003–2005)
 John Moody – rhythm guitar (2005–2006)
 Milad Sadegi – drums, percussion (2003–2006)
 Lindsey Vogt – clean vocals (2003–2007)
 Alex Torres – rhythm and lead guitar, backing vocals (2006–2007)
 Brandon Anderson – unclean vocals, rhythm guitar, keyboards, synthesizers, programming (2006–2010)
 Justin Denson – unclean vocals, keyboards, synthesizers, programming (2010–2011)
 Greg Kerwin – rhythm guitar (2007–2011), lead guitar (2007–2010)
 Cisko Miranda – unclean vocals, rhythm guitar (2011–2014)
 AJ Bartholomew - rhythm guitar, unclean vocals (2015-2022), bass (2016-2017, 2017-2022)
 Tiaday Xavier Ball – bass, backing vocals (2017)

Former touring musicians
 Justin Whitesel – rhythm guitar (2011)
 David Molina – rhythm guitar (2011)
 Manny Contreras – rhythm guitar (2016-2017)
 Comron Fouladi – bass, backing vocals (2017–2019)
 Kevin Koelsch  – bass (2019–2023)

Timeline

Discography

 Reach (2008)
 The World Outside (2009)
 Broken Frames (2010)
 White Lotus (2011)
 Masks (2013)
 Eyes Set to Kill (2018)

Awards and nominations

Revolver Golden Gods Awards

References

External links

Musical groups from Tempe, Arizona
Metalcore musical groups from Arizona
American screamo musical groups
American post-hardcore musical groups
American musical duos
Musical groups established in 2003
MNRK Music Group artists
Female-fronted musical groups